Cuauhtémoc is a town in the Mexican state of Colima. It serves as the municipal seat for the surrounding municipality of  Cuauhtémoc. In the 2005 INEGI Census, it reported a total population of 7,513

The name honours the last tlatoani of the Aztec people, Cuauhtemoc.

In 2013 the municipality became the first in Colima to perform a same-sex marriage.

Climate

References

Populated places in Colima